is a Japanese professional footballer who plays as a forward for KF Bylis.

Club career

Albriex Niigata (Singapore) 
Doi's supreme form was a key reason for Albirex Niigata FC (Singapore)’s title triumph in the 2020 Singapore Premier League season as he smashed in 11 goals and made three assists in 14 appearances. He also registered both the most shots (83) and shots on target (43) of any player in the league. Doi's performance in the league earned him a nomination for the SPL's Player of the Year award.

Hougang United 
Following his exploits with the White Swans last season, he was snapped up by Hougang United for the 2021 Singapore Premier League season. Doi started his career with the Cheetahs at a blistering pace, hitting 4 goals in his first 3 matches for the club. He hit a hat-trick in his next game, bringing his tally for the Cheetahs up to 7 goals in 4 games, sending his team up to the top of the table. His form saw him win the March Player of the Month Award. Doi notched his 10th league goal of the season in just 6 games as his sole strike against Balestier Khalsa FC sent his team to the top of the table. Doi capped off a brilliant individual season in 2021 by snagging both the Singapore Premier League Player Of The Year and the Singapore Premier League Top Goalscorer awards.

Honours

Club

Albriex Niigata (Singapore) 

 Singapore Premier League: 2020

Individual 
 Singapore Premier League Player Of The Year: 2021
 Singapore Premier League Top Scorer: 2021

Career statistics

Club

Notes

References

1997 births
Living people
Association football people from Hyōgo Prefecture
Tokoha University alumni
Japanese footballers
Japanese expatriate footballers
Association football forwards
Singapore Premier League players
Albirex Niigata Singapore FC players
Hougang United FC players
Japanese expatriate sportspeople in Singapore
Expatriate footballers in Singapore
Fujieda MYFC players
J3 League players